State Highway 15 (SH 15) is a New Zealand state highway in the Northland region of the North Island.

History
Prior to 1930, the recommended route by the Automobile Association, from Whangarei to Kaitaia was via Mangakahia and was named Highway 1. Approximately 90 years later a formal designation has been re-instated. The current SH 1 south of Kawakawa was only a rough clay road in the 1920s. Also known as the Northland Inland Freight Route it was declared a state highway in August 2016. Formerly administered by the Far North District Council and Whangarei District Council, in May 2015 the NZ Transport Agency agreed to include it to the state highway network after lobbying from the local authorities and industries given its significance to the regional forestry industry and its connectivity to the regions port near Marsden Point.

Route
State Highway 15 commences at  near Ōkaihau. It follows Te Pua Road for  before intersecting  and turns west, where it shares a concurrency for approximately  into the town of Kaikohe. SH 15 then turns south at Mangakahia Road where it travels on mostly rural road through forestry, changing orientation from a south to a southeast direction, for approximately  where it intersects  at Maungatapere.

From this point SH 15 shares a concurrency with SH 1 southbound for approximately  where it arrives at the Ruakaka roundabout. The last  section of SH 15 after leaving SH 1 is part of the former SH 15A spur which was renamed as part of the new declaration. This highway travels northeast along Port Marsden Highway, terminating at the entrances of Northport and Marsden Point Oil Refinery. The first  of this section of highway runs along the route formerly taken by the southern end of One Tree Point Road, which was significantly realigned as part of its upgrade to highway status. The next  of the highway uses a section of road which was newly built as part of the creation of the highway, whilst the final  uses an existing road which was formerly the northern end of Marsden Point Road.

Former routes

Former SH 15
The first designation of SH 15 was declared in 1997; however it had its highway status revoked in 2003. The highway started at a junction with SH 1 in the suburb of Raumanga, and ran along Rewa Rewa Road, Kioreroa Road and Port Road before terminating at the entrance to Port Whangarei. The route had its highway status revoked in December 2003, as part of the closure of Port Whangarei to commercial shipping and the opening of Northport at Marsden Point. Six months later, in June 2004, SH 15A was gazetted to provide a highway link to the new port facilities at Marsden Point.

Former SH 15A

SH 15A was a former state highway which is now part of the southeastern spur of SH 15 connecting SH 1 near Ruakaka to Marsden Point. For many years 15A was a peculiarity since there wasn't any corresponding SH 15. This is because the original SH 15, which used to connect SH 1 with the former site of Port Whangarei, had its highway designation revoked in December 2003. SH 15A was created six months later, in June 2004, to provide a highway connection to the new site of the port at Marsden Point.

Major intersections

See also
List of New Zealand state highways

References

External links
 New Zealand Transport Agency

15
Transport in the Northland Region